The Bear Flag is a nickname for the state Flag of California.

Bear Flag or The Bear Flag may also refer to:

California-related uses
 Bear Flag Elementary School in the Pocket-Greenhaven suburb of Sacramento, California
 Bear Flag Empire, a fictitious land in a role-playing game
 Bear Flag Republic or California Republic, an 1846 unrecognized breakaway state from Mexico
 Bear Flag (1846)

Other uses
 Bear flag (gay culture), a flag representing the bear subculture within the gay community
 Bear flag (investing), a bearish flag pattern in the price charts of financially traded assets

See also
 Bear Flag Monument dedicated to the Bear Flag revolt
 Flag of Alaska with Ursa Major (great bear)
 Flag of Berlin
 Coat of arms of Madrid